Targowica may refer to:
Targowica Confederation of 1792, which opposed the Polish Constitution of 1791
Targowica/Torgovitsya, once a town now a village in Ukraine, claimed as the place of the above confederation (actually held in Saint Petersburg)
Targowica, Lower Silesian Voivodeship, a village in Lower Silesian Voivodeship (SW Poland)